Dora Dolz de Herman  (Barcelona, 5 November 1941 - Rotterdam, 1 March 2008) was a Spanish-Dutch artist, best known for her outdoor ceramic works in the form of chairs and sofas.

Life and work 
Dolz grew up in Barcelona, where her father had a booth at the flea market. In 1965 she moved to the Netherlands when her husband wanted to pursue a PhD in economics at the Tinbergen Institute. Between 1967 and 1971 she studied at the Rotterdam Academy of Art, where she was a lecturer herself from the 1980s.

As an artist Dotz mainly produced paintings, ceramics, glassware, rugs, which were often pictured in flamboyant colors form. Recurring themes (leitmotifs) in these works were birth, life, suffering and death. Her work is found in the collections of the Museum Boijmans Van Beuningen in Rotterdam and the Museum de Fundatie (Heino). There are sculptures by her in the center of Rotterdam, Rotterdam West, Rotterdam North, Capelle aan den IJssel, Schiedam, Tiel and Groningen.

In 1988 Dotz received the Victorine Heftingprijs, and in January 2008 the municipality of Rotterdam awarded her the Wolfert van Borselen medal. She was awarded the Judith Leysterprize three times, the third time in 1992.

Her daughter is the filmmaker Sonia Herman Dolz, who in 2005 made a movie portrait about her called Portrait of Dora Dolz.

Exhibitions, a selection 
 1973. Gallery 't Venster, Rotterdam.
 1975. Salon der Maassteden, Stedelijk Museum Schiedam.
 1975. Dora Dolz and Guus de Ruyter, De Doelen Rotterdam. 
 1977. Gallery da Costa, Amsterdam
 1981. Gallery Alto, Rotterdam.
 1986. Salon D T' EEN, Gallery De lachende Koe, Rotterdam.
 1987. Leda en de Zwaan, Gallery De lachende Koe Rotterdam
 1992. Keramisch werk en schilderijen van Dora Dolz, Noordbrabants Museum, 's-Hertogenbosch. 
 2005. Galerij Erasmus, Complex Hoboken, Rotterdam.
 2007-08. Boijmans Van Beuningen, Rotterdam.

Gallery

Sculptures

Fauteuils and chaise Longues

References

External links 

 Dora Dolz website

1941 births
2008 deaths
Women artists from Catalonia
Spanish ceramists
Dutch ceramists
Willem de Kooning Academy alumni
Academic staff of Willem de Kooning Academy
People from Barcelona
20th-century Dutch sculptors
Spanish women sculptors
Dutch women sculptors
Spanish women ceramists
Dutch women ceramists
20th-century Spanish women artists
20th-century ceramists
21st-century ceramists
20th-century Dutch women